Enochian magic is a system of ceremonial magic based on the 16th-century writings of John Dee and Edward Kelley, who wrote that their information, including the revealed Enochian language, was delivered to them directly by various angels. Dee's journals contain the record of these workings, the Enochian script, and the tables of correspondences used in Enochian magic. Dee and Kelley believed their visions gave them access to secrets contained within Liber Logaeth, which Dee and Kelley referred to as the "Book of Enoch".

Enochian magic involves the evocation and commanding of various spirits.

Background

In the early 1580s, John Dee had become discontented with his progress in learning the secrets of nature. Dee wrote:

He subsequently began to turn energetically towards the supernatural as a means to acquire knowledge. He sought to contact spirits through the use of a scryer or crystal-gazer, which he thought would act as an intermediary between himself and the angels. Dee's first attempts with several scryers were unsatisfactory, but in 1582 he met Edward Kelley (1555–1597/8), then calling himself Edward Talbot to disguise his conviction for "coining" or forgery, who impressed him greatly with his abilities.

Dee took Kelley into his service and began to devote all his energies to his supernatural pursuits. These "spiritual conferences" or "actions" were conducted with intense Christian piety, always after periods of purification, prayer and fasting. Dee was convinced of the benefits they could bring to mankind. The character of Kelley is harder to assess: some conclude that he acted with cynicism, but delusion or self-deception cannot be ruled out. Kelley's "output" is remarkable for its volume, intricacy and vividness. Through Kelley, the angels laboriously dictated several books in this way,  some in a previously unknown language which Dee called Angelical — now more commonly known as Enochian.

Origins and manuscript sources
The Enochian system of magic is primarily the work of two men: John Dee and Edward Kelley. Additional contributions to the study of Enochian magic were made by Thomas Rudd (1583?–1656), Elias Ashmole (1617–1692), Samuel Liddell MacGregor Mathers (1854–1918), William Wynn Westcott (1848–1925), Aleister Crowley (1875–1947), and Israel Regardie (1907–1985).

Five Books of Mystery
This manuscript, Sloane MS 3188, is an account of the 'actions' or workings undertaken in the Liber Logaeth, titled Mysteriorum Libri Quinque ("Five Books of Mystery"). Mysteriorum Libri Quinque is the diary for 22 December 1581 – 23 May 1583. It includes the first five Books of Mystery (and Appendix), ending where Casaubon's A True and Faithful Relation begins. It describes the furniture of the temple; the Seal of God (Sigillum Dei Aemeth); the Tables of Light; the Great Circle and corresponding Collected Table of 49 Good Angels; the Mystic Heptarchy and the Tables of Creation; the Angelic Alphabet (Dee's copies) and the beginning of Loagaeth (i.e., the first few folios of Sloane MS 3189). There are two transcripts of this manuscript available today: from Joseph Peterson and C. L. Whitby.

Per editor Geoffrey James's The Enochian Invocation of Dr. John Dee, the five books are:

Book One: The Magick of Enoch

This book introduces the 49 "Tables of Enoch", referring to them as "voyces or callings" and "Natural Keyes" to open the "Gates of Understanding"; the "Angelic Calls or Keys", the "Primordial Language",  the 91 "Earthly Princes", and the "Great Table of the Quarters", as well as the topic of "the Book, Vestments, & Days".

Book Two: The Mystical Heptarchy
Book Three: The Forty-Eight Angelic Keys
Book Four: Earthly Knowledge, Aid & Victory
Book Five: The Angels of the Four Quarters

Liber Logaeth
Liber Logaeth (lit. "Book of the Speech of God", also known as Liber Mysteriorum, Sextus et Sanctus ["The Sixth and Sacred Book of the Mysteries"], referred to by Dee as The Book of Enoch)  (1583) is preserved in the British Library mostly within what are known as the Sloane manuscripts, chiefly Sloane MS 3189 (but parts of Sloane MS 3188 and the Cotton MS Appendix I also contain the beginning and end of the book, with some copying of material in Sloane MS 3188 appearing in Sloane MS 3189). The correct title is Liber Loagaeth, but Loagaeth has been so frequently misprinted as Logaeth that the latter spelling is common usage. 

Written up by Edward Kelley, it is composed of 73 folios (18 from Sloane MS 3188, 54 from Sloane MS 3189, and 1 (text only) from Cotton MS Appendix I). The book contains 96 complex magical grids of letters (94 of which are 49×49 grids of letters, one of which is a table composed of 49 rows of text, and one of which is a table of 40 rows of text and 9 rows of 49 letters). The final folio from Cotton MS Appendix I was 21 words consisting of 112 letters, which according to the text, was apparently able to be somehow reduced to 105 letters and arranged into five 3x7 tables, three on the front and two on the back (cf. Cotton MS Appendix I). 

It is from Liber Logaeth that Dee and Kelley derived the 48 Calls or Keys (see below), and in which are concealed the keys to the Mystical Heptarchy, a related magical work by Dee. Dee himself left little information on his Sixth Holy Book apart from saying that it contained 'The Mysterie of our Creation, The Age of many years, and the conclusion of the World' and that the first page in the book signified Chaos. (Note that the title, The Book of Enoch, attributed to the text of Liber Logaeth, is not to be confused with the apocryphal  Book of Enoch, which was considered lost in Dee's time.

Other manuscripts
Another manuscript is Sloane MS 3191, which comprises: 48 Angelic Keys; The Book of Earthly Science, Aid and Victory; On the Mystic Heptarchy; and Invocations of the Good Angels.

Two further manuscripts from Dee and Kelley's workings pertain to Enochian magic:
Cotton MS Appendix XLVI Part I is the diary for 28 May 1583 – 15 August 1584 inclusive: The Sixth (and Sacred) Parallel Book of the Mysteries (not to be confused with "The Sixth and Sacred Book of the Mysteries", which is part of Liber Logaeth - see above) and "The Seventh Book of the Mysteries" (Kraków), beginning where A True and Faithful Relation begins. It includes the arrival of Prince Adalbert Laski, the journey to Kraków and the dictation of the 48 Calls or Keys (including descriptions of the 91 Parts of the Earth), as well as the Vision of the Four Watchtowers and also the Great Table.
Cotton MS Appendix XLVI Part II is the diary for 15 August 1584 – 23 May 1587 (and 20 March – 7 September 1607) inclusive: The Book of Praha, The Royal Stephanic Mysteries, The Puccian Action, The Book of Resurrection, The Third Action of Trebon and the remaining Spirit Actions at Mortlake in 1607, ending where A True and Faithful Relation ends. (It may be seen that Casaubon's A True and Faithful Relation is equivalent to the Cotton MS Appendix in toto, i.e. Dee and Kelley's diaries from 28 May 1585-23 Sept 1607).

Meric Casaubon's 1659 edition of part of these diaries (Cotton Appendix MS XLVI), entitled A True & Faithful Relation of What Passed for Many Yeers between John Dee and Some Spirits, contains notorious transcription errors which in some cases were transmitted through many subsequent republications of the Dee/Kelly material; Casaubon's edition was intended to discredit Dee and Kelly by accusing them of dealing with the Christian Devil. An expanded facsimile edition of Casaubon was published by Magickal Childe in 1992.

Dee and Kelley's surviving manuscripts later came into the possession of Elias Ashmole, who preserved them and made copies of some, along with annotations.

The system

The two pillars of modern Enochian magic, as outlined in Liber Chanokh, are the Elemental Tablets (including the "Tablet of Union") and the Keys of the 30 Aethyrs. The Enochian model of the universe is depicted by Dee as a square called "The Great Table" (made up of the 4 Elemental Tablets and incorporating the Tablet of Union), surrounded by 30 concentric circles representing the 30 Aethyrs or Aires.

The Angelical Keys
The essence of Enochian magic involves the recitation of one or more of nineteen Angelical Keys, which are also referred to as Calls. These keys are a series of rhetorical exhortations which function as evocations when read in the Enochian language. They are used to effect the "opening of 'gates' into various mystical realms."

The first eighteen keys are used to 'open' the realms of the elements and sub-elements, which are mapped onto the quadrants and sub-quadrants of the Great Tablet.

The nineteenth key is used to 'open' the Thirty Aethyrs. The Aethyrs are conceived of as forming a map of the entire universe in the form of concentric rings which expand outward from the innermost to the outermost Aethyr.

The Great Table
The angels of the four quarters are symbolized by the Elemental Tablets — four large magical word-square Tables (collectively called "The Great Table"). Most of the well-known Enochian angels are drawn from the Elemenal Tablets of the Great Table.
	
Each of the four tablets (representing the Elements of Earth, Air, Fire and Water), is collectively "governed" by a hierarchy of spiritual entities which runs (as explained in Crowley's Liber Chanokh) as the Three Holy Names, the Great Elemental King, the Six Seniors (aka Elders) (these make a total of 24 Elders as seen in the Revelation of St. John), the Two Divine Names of the Calvary Cross, the Kerubim, and the Sixteen Lesser Angels. Each tablet is further divided into four sub-quadrants (sometimes referred to as 'sub-angles') where we find the names of various Archangels and Angels who govern the quarters of the world. In this way, the entire universe, visible and invisible, is depicted as teeming with living intelligences. Each of the Elemental tablets is also divided into four sections by a figure known as the Great Central Cross. The Great Central cross consists of the two central vertical columns of the Elemental Tablet (the Linea Patris and Linea Filii) and the central horizontal line (known as the Linea Spiritus Sancti).
	
In addition to the four Elemental Tablets, a twenty-square cell known as the Tablet of Union (aka The Black Cross, representing Spirit) completes the representation of the five traditional elemental attributes used in magic - Earth, Air, Water, Fire and Spirit. The Tablet of Union is derived from within the Great Central Cross of the Great Table.

The Thirty Æthyrs
The 30 Aethyrs are numbered from 30 (TEX, the lowest and consequently the closest to the Great Table) to 1 (LIL, the highest, representing the Supreme Attainment). Magicians working the Enochian system record their impressions and visions within each of the successive Enochian Aethyrs.

Each of the 30 Aethyrs is populated by "Governors" (3 for each Aethyr, except TEX which has four, thus a total of 91 Governors). Each of the governors has a sigil which can be traced onto the Great Tablet of Earth.

The Temple

Temple "furniture" required for the performance of Enochian magic includes:
The Holy Table: a table with a top engraved with a Hexagram, a surrounding border of Enochian letters, and in the middle a Twelvefold table (cell) engraved with individual Enochian letters. According to Duquette and Hyatt, the Holy Table "does not directly concern Elemental or Aethyrical workings. Angels found on the Holy Table are not called forth in these operations."
The Seven Planetary Talismans: The names on these talismans (which are engraved on tin and placed on the surface of the Holy Table) are those of the Goetia. According to Duquette and Hyatt, "this indicates (or at least implies) Dee's familiarity with the Lemegeton and his attempt, at least early in his workings, to incorporate it in the Enochian system." As with the Holy Table, Spirits found on these talismans are not called forth in these operations.
The Sigillum dei Aemeth, Holy Sevenfold Table, or 'Seal of God's Truth': The symbol derives from Liber Juratus (aka The Sworn Book of Honorius or Grimoire of Honorius, of which Dee owned a copy). Five versions of this complex diagram are made from bee's wax, and engraved with the various lineal figures, letters and numbers. The four smaller ones are placed under the feet of the Holy Table. The fifth and larger one (about nine inches in diameter) is covered with a red cloth, placed on the Holy Table, and is used to support the "Shew-Stone" or "Speculum" (crystal or other device used for scrying). Scrying is an essential element of the magical system. Dee and Kelly's technique was to gaze into a concave obsidian mirror. Crowley habitually held a large topaz mounted upon a wooden cross to his forehead. Other methods include gazing into crystals, ink, fire or even a blank TV screen. 

A magician's ring engraved with the god-name Pele.
The rod "el" painted in three sections, the ends being black and the middle red.

Adaptation by the Hermetic Order of the Golden Dawn

Little else became of Dee's work until late in the nineteenth century, when it was incorporated by a brotherhood of adepts in England.

The rediscovery of Dee and Kelley's material by Samuel Liddell MacGregor Mathers of the Hermetic Order of the Golden Dawn in the 1880s led to Mathers developing the material into a comprehensive system of ceremonial magic. Magicians invoked the Enochian deities whose names were written on the tablets. They also traveled in their bodies of light into these subtle regions and recorded their psychic experiences. The two major branches of the system were then grafted on to the Adeptus Minor curriculum of the Golden Dawn. According to Aleister Crowley, the magician starts with the 30th aethyr and works up to the first, exploring only so far as his level of initiation will permit.

According to Chris Zalewski's 1994 book, the Golden Dawn also invented the game of Enochian chess, in which aspects of the Enochian Tablets were used for divination. They used four chessboards without symbols on them, just sets of colored squares, and each board is associated with one of the four elements of magic.

Florence Farr founded the Sphere Group which also experimented with Enochian magic.

Criticism of the Golden Dawn adaptation
Paul Foster Case (1884–1954), an occultist who began his magical career with the Alpha et Omega, was critical of the Enochian system. According to Case, the system of Dee and Kelley was  partial from the start, an incomplete system derived from an earlier and complete Qabalistic system, and lacked sufficient protection methods. Case believed he had witnessed the physical breakdown of a number of practitioners of Enochian magic, due to the lack of protective methods. When Case founded his own magical order, the Builders of the Adytum (B.O.T.A.), he removed the Enochian system and substituted elemental tablets based on Qabalistic formulae communicated to him by Master R.

Current studies and resources 

There have been several compilations of Enochian words made to form Enochian dictionaries. A scholarly study is Donald Laycock's The Complete Enochian Dictionary. Also useful is Vinci's Gmicalzoma: An Enochian Dictionary. Authentic pronunciations, according to the Hermetic Order of the Golden Dawn usage, are given by Israel Regardie in a set of Golden Dawn instructional CDs. Regardie's Enochian dictionary is also reprinted in Crowley, Duquette, and Hyatt, Enochian World of Aleister Crowley.

Since Dee is known to have been a spy for Elizabeth I's court, there are interpretations of his Angelic manuscripts as cryptographic documents - most likely polyalphabetic ciphers - designed to disguise political messages.

In popular culture
Since horror writer H. P. Lovecraft, in his short work "The History of the Necronomicon" (written 1927, published after Lovecraft's death, in 1938), made John Dee the translator of one of the versions of his mythical book of forbidden lore, The Necronomicon (an example of Lovecraft's use of the technique of "pseudo-authenticity"), much has been written connecting Dee and Enochian magic with The Necronomicon. The fanciful connection between Dee and The Necronomicon was suggested by Lovecraft's friend Frank Belknap Long.

See also
 Magical formula
 Monas Hieroglyphica

References

Notes

Citations

Works cited

 
 .
 .
 
 .
 .
 .
. From the collected works known as Mysteriorum libri quinque.
 .
 
 .
 .
 .
 .
 
 .
 .
 .
 .
 .
 .
 .

Manuscripts

Further reading

 .
 .
 .
 .
 .
 
 .
 .